Lotts may refer to:

 Lotts Creek, a creek in Missouri and Iowa, USA
 Megan Lotts, U.S. librarian
 Quantel Lotts (born 1986) U.S. convict
 The Lotts (formerly: Stables To Cavens House), Kirkbean, Dumfries and Galloway, Scotland, UK; see List of listed buildings in Kirkbean, Dumfries and Galloway

See also

Lotta (disambiguation)

 Lotts Creek Township (disambiguation)
 North Lotts, Docklands Strategic Development Zone, Dublin, Ireland
 South Lotts, Dublin, Ireland
 
 Lott (disambiguation)
 LOTS (disambiguation)
 Lot (disambiguation)